"Son of Coma Guy" is the seventh episode of the third season of House and the fifty-third episode overall.

Plot

Medicine
The episode begins with House eating his lunch next to "vegetative state guy" and watching television. As he and Wilson talk, the son of the comatose man walks into the room. House tries an experiment on the boy: he flashes the lights on and off, then throws a bag of chips at the boy, and walks over to him, but the boy does not see the chips or House. House diagnoses him as being akinetopsic, unable to see things in motion, a condition which is often accompanied by seizures. The boy suddenly starts to have convulsions, and is admitted to the hospital (much to House's delight).

The team learns that the boy's name is Kyle, but they cannot tell what caused his seizure. They find multiple wine bottles in Kyle's backpack, so the team suspects liver failure. However, House shoots down all of their guesses, claiming that the condition is genetic. Kyle has no living relatives, except one: "Vegetative State Guy", his father whose name is Gabe. House proceeds to wake Gabe up using a large dose of L-Dopa and amphetamines. Cuddy and the rest of the team try to stop him, but he proceeds nonetheless. He cites a South African study that shows that comatose patients may be woken up for hours at a time, but Cuddy does not believe him. Nonetheless, Gabe wakes up.

When Gabe is informed that he only has one day until he lapses back into his coma, he decides that he wants to drive to Atlantic City to get a hoagie from a specific deli. House agrees to go along with him, and asks Wilson if they can go in his car. Wilson decides to come along to make sure nothing bad happens. House asks Gabe many questions along the way.

Meanwhile, House finds that Gabe used to make boats finished with mildew-resistant paint. House concludes that Kyle, as a child, was around the painting without a facemask and got mercury poisoning from the paint. House calls the team, and they begin the test. Gabe, annoyed that House's questions are becoming more personal, establishes a quid pro quo style of questioning that forces House to answer a question every time he asks one.

House, Gabe, and Wilson arrive at Atlantic City, but they cannot locate the hoagie shop. Gabe wants to go to a casino instead, so House and Wilson get a nearby hotel for the night. House continues the questioning at the hotel, ordering Gabe to give a total recap of how his family members died. During Gabe's explanation, House notices a common theme with the deaths, and that Gabe blames Kyle for his mother's death in a house fire (which was when Gabe entered his vegetative state). House diagnoses this as MERRF syndrome and calls Foreman to run the test. Foreman informs him that even if they cure ragged red fibers (MERRF), Kyle has a fatal cardiomyopathy.

Gabe says he wants to donate his heart to Kyle, given that he will fall into a vegetative state soon anyway. Wilson opposes this, but House agrees, so he calls Cuddy to schedule the transplant. Cuddy flatly refuses the transplant, since it will equate to murdering Gabe. House asks Wilson to leave the room, saying, "You have lied to the cops enough for me." House then lays out to Gabe ways to kill oneself that would keep the heart intact. While Wilson creates an alibi for himself and House in the casino, Gabe kills himself by hanging after overdosing on aspirin to help protect his heart. Kyle then successfully undergoes heart transplant surgery.

House
In the hotel, House had promised Gabe that he would answer one humiliating question after he had finished questioning Gabe about his family. Gabe asks why House became a doctor. Reluctantly, House reveals that while his family was living in Japan, he saw a man who was from the buraku, a Japanese social class traditionally looked down on. His appearance caused House to mistake him for a janitor, but he was consulted about difficult cases, because no matter his background and social stature, the other doctors listened to him because he was right.

Tritter
In the beginning of the episode, Wilson walks in and confronts House over the fact that House stole one of his prescription pads and faked his signature in order to get more Vicodin, and tells House he has been questioned by Detective Tritter.

Later in the episode, Detective Tritter questions Cameron about how much Vicodin House takes, and Cameron says around six pills a day, which is an extreme understatement, and Tritter is about to ask her more questions when she gets paged by Chase and Foreman. They saw her with Tritter, and decide to tell the same story, but not to tell House about it. Later, both of them are also interviewed by Tritter.

In the final scene, while House and Wilson talk, Wilson tries to withdraw money from his ATM and learns that his account has been frozen as a part of the ongoing police investigation into House's drug use. House seems ashamed by the trouble he's put Wilson in, but is still confident that the case will not escalate.

Awards 

John Larroquette submitted this episode for consideration in the category of "Outstanding Guest Actor in a Drama Series" on his own behalf for the 2007 Emmy Awards.

References

External links
 "House: Son of a Coma Guy - TV.com", Copyright 2006 CNET Networks, Inc., November 13, 2006.
 FOX.com-House official site
 

House (season 3) episodes
2006 American television episodes
Television episodes about suicide
Television episodes directed by Dan Attias

fr:24 heures pour vivre et mourir